Not Since You is a 2009 romantic drama film directed by Jeff Stephenson and starring Desmond Harrington and Elden Henson. The film premiered at the 2009 Hollywood Film Festival, and released to theatres in Athens, Georgia, on April 2, 2010.

Plot

A romantic drama about a tight-knit group of college friends who graduated from New York University the year of 9/11 and reunite years later for a weekend wedding in Georgia. Unresolved conflicts and love affairs spark again into the reality of the group. Old wounds are brought to the surface. Several uncanny similarities to "The Big Chill", where college friends gather for the funeral of one of their group, in a southern locale.

Cast
Desmond Harrington as Sam Nelson
Kathleen Robertson as Amy Smith
Christian Kane as Ryan Roberts
Jon Abrahams as Howard Stieglitz
Sunny Mabrey as Victoria Gary
Will Estes as Billy Sweetzer
Elden Henson as Joey 'Fudge' Fudgler
Sara Rue as Sarah 'Doogs' Doogins
Barry Corbin as Uncle Dennis
Liane Balaban as Heather

References

External links

2009 romantic drama films
American romantic drama films
2000s English-language films
2000s American films